Ole Olsen may refer to:
 Ole Olsen (baseball) (1894–1980), pitcher for the Detroit Tigers
 Ole Olsen (comedian) (1892–1963), American vaudeville comedian
 Ole Olsen (filmmaker) (1863–1943), Danish film producer and founder of Nordisk Film
 Ole Olsen (musician) (1850–1927), Norwegian organist, composer, and conductor
 Ole Olsen (speedway rider) (born 1946), Danish speedway rider and three-time World Champion
 Ole Olsen (sport shooter) (1869–1944), Danish sport shooter
 Ole Alfred Olsen Norwegian resistance fighter and merchant seaman, see Nils Økland
 Ole Andres Olsen (1845–1915), Norwegian-American Seventh-day Adventist leader
 Ole Birk Olesen (born 1972), Danish politician
 Ola Dybwad-Olsen (born 1946), Norwegian footballer
 Ole H. Olson (1872–1954), governor of North Dakota (1934–1935)
 Ole Kristian Olsen (born 1950), Norwegian footballer
 Ole Tobias Olsen (1830–1924), Norwegian teacher and minister
 Ole Wøhlers Olsen (born 1942), Danish ambassador
 Olle Olsson (born 1948), Swedish handball player
 Ole Olson, an 1889 play by American actor and humorist Gus Heege